Yoshinao is a masculine Japanese given name.

Possible writings
Yoshinao can be written using different combinations of kanji characters. Here are some examples: 

義直, "justice, frankness"
義尚, "justice, still"
佳直, "skilled, frankness"
佳尚, "skilled, still"
善直, "virtuous, frankness"
善尚, "virtuous, still"
吉直, "good luck, frankness"
吉尚, "good luck, still"
良直, "good, frankness"
良尚, "good, still"
恭直, "respectful, frankness"
嘉直, "excellent, frankness"
嘉尚, "excellent, still"
能直, "capacity, frankness"
喜直, "rejoice, frankness"

The name can also be written in hiragana よしなお or katakana ヨシナオ.

Notable people with the name

 (born 1993), Japanese baseball player
 (1918–2008), Japanese World War II flying ace
 (1923–2000), Japanese composer
 (1601–1650), Japanese daimyō

Japanese masculine given names